The Centre for India & Global Business (CIGB) is a research center was launched in March 2009 as part of Cambridge Judge Business School at the University of Cambridge, England, to support the university's growing engagement with India.  As a research centre and an engagement platform CIGB is dedicated to the study of India's rapidly expanding role in the global knowledge economy.

History
CIGB was established with initial funding from the BP foundation. The academic director of CIGB is Professor Jaideep Prabhu, the first Jawaharlal Nehru Professor of Indian Business and Enterprise at the University of Cambridge, who took up the post in September 2008. The founding executive director of CIGB was Navi Radjou, who served between January 2009 and June 2011. The centre has 14 other academic members, including Cambridge Judge Business School faculty and PhD students.

Research activities
CIGB conducts research in collaboration with a global network of academic partners around three complementary themes:
India as a global innovation hub: how and why firms from around the world are increasingly locating their global R&D and innovation activities in India
Indian firms going global: how Indian firms are going global on the back of innovation in India or in order to become more innovative relative to global competitors
Co-innovation with the bottom of the socio-economic pyramid (mass markets): how multinational and Indian firms are engaging those who live on less than $5 a day as value-adding partners through innovative products, services and business models.
A major issue underlying these three themes is how India is emerging as a learning laboratory for affordable and sustainable innovation to deal with the global challenges of scarcity and diversity.

The academic projects undertaken by CIGB involve field research in India which CIGB-related faculty visit frequently in order to collect data and conduct interviews with local policy-makers, entrepreneurs, and corporate executives.

CIGB produces case studies that feed into its outreach and networks activities. Its research has been featured in leading newspapers and magazines worldwide.

Outreach and networks
CIGB also hosts conferences and seminars that bring together academics, corporate leaders, and policy-makers from all over the world to discuss and disseminate latest research findings as well as policy and industry best practices. These events are hosted both in Cambridge as well as in major Indian cities. For instance, in March 2009, Professor Jaideep Prabhu, director of CIGB, delivered his inaugural lecture in New Delhi, which was chaired by Montek Singh Ahluwalia, deputy chairman of the Indian Planning Commission. In May 2009, CIGB hosted in Cambridge a major conference titled “Innovation in India and China: How to Create Value from Emerging Markets,” which explored the rise of India and China as both fast-growing global markets and world-class sources of innovation.

Since its inception, CIGB has also hosted a number of speakers including: Nandan Nilekani, chairman of the new Unique Identification Authority of India (UIDAI) and former co-chairman of Infosys Technologies (April 2009); former Indian president Dr A. P. J. Abdul Kalam (June 2009); Ravi Kant, vice-chairman of Tata Motors; and Dr Ramesh Mashelkar, former director general of the Council of Scientific and Industrial Research, who delivered the inaugural BP Annual Lecture at Cambridge Judge Business Business on 21 June 2010.

Online engagement
In November 2009, at the World Economic Forum’s India Economic Summit, CIGB launched Indovations.Net, an interactive, multimedia website that educates users worldwide about innovations in India across five domains: business, social, energy/environment, art/culture, and science & technology. This website addresses a fundamental questions such as, What can the world learn from India-inspired innovation – or Indovation – and how people can benefit from it, etc.

Prof Jaideep Prabhu and Navi Radjou write blog posts on innovation, emerging markets, and global leadership on the Harvard Business Review website.

References

Think tanks established in 2009
India and Global Business
Business education
India-focused think tanks
2009 establishments in the United Kingdom